Conandrium is a genus of flowering plants belonging to the family Primulaceae.

Its native range is Malesia.

Species:

Conandrium polyanthum 
Conandrium rhynchocarpum

References

Primulaceae
Primulaceae genera